Safe Harbour is a novel written by Danielle Steel and published by Random House in November 2003. The book is Steel's sixty-first novel. It was adapted into a direct-to-DVD film.

Synopsis
At eleven, Pip Mackenzie has experienced such tragedy leaving her mother inconsolable. As she wanders the beach while her mother is shut up indoors, she stumbles upon Matt Bowles. An artist and divorcee, Pip reminds him of his daughter and they strike up an unusual friendship. Her mother, a French woman named Ophélie, is sceptical at first but soon discovers that Matt has lit up both of their lives.

When the summer comes to an end, Ophélie and Pip leave for the city but find life without Matt painful. As Ophélie begins a volunteer job at a city outreach program for the homeless, she tries to begin the long process of healing. But as she is betrayed in the worst way, Matt appears and allows her to be herself and finally see a way through the mist of Safe Harbour.

The novel ends with Matt and Ophélie's wedding in the beach with Pip as the witness at Safe Harbour.

List of characters

Ophélie MacKenzie
Mother of Pip who is depressed after the death of her son, Chad and her husband, Ted.

Phillippa Mackenzie
Daughter of Ophélie Mackenzie who befriends Matt at Safe Harbour

Matthew Bowles
A lonely divorcee who befriends Pip at Safe Harbour

Andrea Wilson
Ophélie's best friend, a godmother of Pip.

Ted MacKenzie
Ophélie's late husband who died in a plane crash, having left an enormous fortune of his energy inventions

William
Andrea's infant son

Footnotes
http://www.randomhouse.com/features/steel/bookshelf/display.pperl?isbn=9780385336307

2004 American novels
American novels adapted into films
American romance novels
Novels by Danielle Steel
Delacorte Press books